The Rat River is a tributary of the Red River of the North in southern Manitoba, Canada.  It is part of the watershed of Hudson Bay (via Red River, Lake Winnipeg, and the Nelson River).

The river is found between the Roseau River and Seine River on the eastern side of the Red River. It flows east to west through the rural municipalities of Piney, La Broquerie, Stuartburn, Hanover, De Salaberry, Emerson - Franklin, and Ritchot, as well as the village of St-Pierre-Jolys.  It joins the Red River approximately three kilometres northeast of Ste. Agathe, Manitoba.  The river is dammed near the community of St. Malo, creating a reservoir known as St. Malo Lake.  The northern part of this lake and surrounding land comprise St. Malo Provincial Park.

See also
Rat River (Burntwood River), a tributary of the Burntwood River and forms the north–south part of the Churchill River Diversion. 
List of rivers of Manitoba

External links
 Seine-Rat River Conservation District

Rivers of Manitoba
Tributaries of Hudson Bay